Godoy Cruz is a city in the province of Mendoza, Argentina.

History
Godoy Cruz was initially known as Villa de San Vicente (since 1872) and then as Villa Belgrano (1889). On 9 February 1909 it received city status and its current name, in homage to Dr. Tomás Godoy Cruz, who represented the province of Mendoza in the Congress of Tucumán and was also a provincial governor and legislator.

Sports
Godoy Cruz is home to Godoy Cruz Antonio Tomba, a football club which plays in the Argentine Primera División. Another important club in the city is Andes Talleres Sport Club, which disputes the Argentine Regional Tournament. Both teams dispute the classic of the city.

References

 
 Municipality of Godoy Cruz — Official website.
 InterTourNet — Godoy Cruz: general and touristic information.

Populated places in Mendoza Province
Mendoza Province
Cities in Argentina
Argentina